Rosa King (March 14, 1939 – December 12, 2000) was an American jazz and blues saxophonist and singer who made her fame in Amsterdam.

Career
King was born in Macon, Georgia, United States. During her career, she worked with Ben E. King, Cab Calloway, Eric Burdon, and Sly Hampton. Her reputation was boosted by a tenor sax battle with Stan Getz at the North Sea Jazz Festival in 1978. She appeared on the TV show Sesame Street and in European television shows, as well as the cult film Comeback by Eric Burdon. Many careers were launched in her band, including those of Candy Dulfer, Saskia Laroo, and Alex Britti. She died from a heart attack in Italy shortly after a televised performance with Alex Britti in December 2000.

Although King was popular in Europe, she had little exposure in America except for brief periods when she lived in New York City, maintaining an apartment there for many years even while living in Amsterdam. The year before she died, she returned to Georgia to perform with a band under the name Rosa King and the Looters. Band members included J. Lyon Layden on guitar, Eric Layden on bass, Kristina Train on vocals and violin, Jeff Evans on drums, and Dan Walker on keyboards. During the same year, she performed at a jazz festival in South Africa and several dates in the Netherlands. Her last performance in Italy was a reunion with guitarist Alex Britti in a nationwide televised concert with nearly 100,000 people in attendance. Although she had suffered several heart attacks the week before, she performed in a wheelchair. Twelve hours later she died. A Rosa King Foundation was established in the Netherlands to help young female artists, and a memorial concert was conducted at the Melkweg concert house in Amsterdam.

Discography

Trivia
King went to school with Richard Penniman (Little Richard).

References

1939 births
2000 deaths
American jazz saxophonists
American jazz singers
American women jazz singers
Musicians from Macon, Georgia
Dutch people of American descent
20th-century American singers
20th-century American saxophonists
20th-century American women singers
Women jazz saxophonists